A statue of David I. Walsh by Joseph Coletti (sometimes called the David Ignatius Walsh Monument or Senator David I. Walsh) is installed along Boston's Charles River Esplanade, in the U.S. state of Massachusetts.

Description and history
The 1954 memorial was commissioned by the Metropolitan District Commission. Its bronze sculpture of Walsh measures approximately 8 x 3 x 3 ft., and is mounted on a square base attached to a curved granite wall. The front of the base had a bronze relief plaque of an eagle, but was missing when the memorial was surveyed as part of the Smithsonian Institution's "Save Outdoor Sculpture!" program in 1997. The back of the curved wall was also missing two of three bronze plaques, which depicted the seal of Massachusetts and U.S. Naval Affairs Committee insignia. The bronze plaque remaining, as of 1997, shows an elderly man holding a tablet.

See also

 1954 in art

References

1954 establishments in Massachusetts
1954 sculptures
Bronze sculptures in Massachusetts
Charles River Esplanade
Granite sculptures in Massachusetts
Monuments and memorials in Boston
Outdoor sculptures in Boston
Sculptures of birds in the United States
Sculptures of men in Massachusetts
Statues in Boston